Iodine-129 (129I) is a long-lived radioisotope of iodine which occurs naturally, but also is of special interest in the monitoring and effects of man-made nuclear fission products, where it serves as both tracer and potential radiological contaminant.

Formation and decay

129I is one of seven long-lived fission products. It is primarily formed from the fission of uranium and plutonium in nuclear reactors. Significant amounts were released into the atmosphere as a result of nuclear weapons testing in the 1950s and 1960s.

It is also naturally produced in small quantities, due to the spontaneous fission of natural uranium, by cosmic ray spallation of trace levels of xenon in the atmosphere, and by cosmic ray muons striking tellurium-130.

129I decays with a half-life of 15.7 million years, with low-energy beta and gamma emissions, to stable xenon-129 (129Xe).

Fission product
129I is one of the seven long-lived fission products that are produced in significant amounts. Its yield is 0.706% per fission of 235U. Larger proportions of other iodine isotopes such as 131I are produced, but because these all have short half-lives, iodine in cooled spent nuclear fuel consists of about  129I and  the only stable iodine isotope, 127I.  
  
Because 129I is long-lived and relatively mobile in the environment, it is of particular importance in long-term management of spent nuclear fuel. In a deep geological repository for unreprocessed used fuel, 129I is likely to be the radionuclide of most potential impact at long times.

Since 129I has a modest neutron absorption cross-section of 30 barns, and is relatively undiluted by other isotopes of the same element, it is being studied for disposal by nuclear transmutation by re-irradiation with neutrons or by high-powered lasers.

Applications

Groundwater age dating 
129I is not deliberately produced for any practical purposes.  However, its long half-life and its relative mobility in the environment have made it useful for a variety of dating applications.  These include identifying very old waters based on the amount of natural 129I or its 129Xe decay product, as well as identifying younger groundwaters by the increased anthropogenic 129I levels since the 1960s.

Meteorite age dating 

In 1960 physicist John H. Reynolds discovered that certain meteorites contained an isotopic anomaly in the form of an overabundance of 129Xe. He inferred that this must be a decay product of long-decayed radioactive 129I. This isotope is produced in quantity in nature only in supernova explosions. As the half-life of 129I is comparatively short in astronomical terms, this demonstrated that only a short time had passed between the supernova and the time the meteorites had solidified and trapped the 129I. These two events (supernova and solidification of gas cloud) were inferred to have happened during the early history of the Solar System, as the 129I isotope was likely generated before the Solar System was formed, but not long before, and seeded the solar gas cloud isotopes with isotopes from a second source. This supernova source may also have caused collapse of the solar gas cloud.

See also 
Isotopes of iodine
Iodine in biology
Xenon tetrachloride

References

Further reading

External links
ANL factsheet
Monitoring iodine-129 in air and milk samples collected near the Hanford Site: an investigation of historical iodine monitoring data
Studies with natural and anthropogenic iodine isotopes: iodine distribution and cycling in the global environment
Some Publications using 129I Data from IsoTrace, 1997-2002 

Isotopes of iodine
Fission products
Radionuclides used in radiometric dating